Pingju or Ping opera is a form of Chinese opera from northern China.

History
Pingju originated in Tangshan, Hebei, near the city of Tianjin. Among all China's regional operas, it was the most famous in the Republican period for its passionate performances and romantic plots.

Movies based upon and incorporating Pingju include Zhang Shichuan's 1936 Red Begonia   Hǎitáng Hóng), starring Bai Yushuang.

Performers
Bai Yushuang was known as the "Queen of Pingju". Other famed performers include Xin Fengxia and her mentor Hua Furong.

References

Bibliography

Further reading

Chinese opera
Culture in Hebei
Tangshan